Nadine Gosselin (born October 4, 1977) is a Canadian former competitive figure skater. She is the 2000 Quebec champion. She competed at three Grand Prix events and placed fourth at the 1999 Canadian Championships.

In May 2002, Skate Canada invited Gosselin to the 2002 Skate Canada International but transferred the invitation to another skater eight weeks later.

Programs

Competitive highlights 
GP: Grand Prix

References

External links 
 

1977 births
Canadian female single skaters
Living people
People from Capitale-Nationale
Sportspeople from Quebec
Competitors at the 2003 Winter Universiade